Melbourne tram route 16 is operated by Yarra Trams on the Melbourne tram network from Melbourne University to Kew. The 20.2 kilometre route is operated out of Malvern depot with Z and D1 class trams.

History
Route 16 was first allocated to the line between the City (Swanston Street) and St Kilda Beach on 26 April 1936 following the electrification of the Brunswick cable tram line. Prior to that, trams on the northern section of Sydney Road would run via Swanston Street to the southern suburbs. Route 16 ran the service between Coburg and St Kilda Beach. After 1936, trams traditionally terminated at the Victoria Street terminus, but following an accident in 1991, trams instead terminated at the Queensberry Street crossover. Due to congestion during peak hours at the crossover, some trams continued north to Melbourne University. Finally on 17 January 1996, a permanent shunt was built at Melbourne University. From then on, route 16 trams were altered run full-time to Melbourne University. Traditionally, Route 16 ran between St Kilda Beach to a City terminus along Swanston Street, but most services would in fact continue north to Moreland as route 15. However, following the elimination of shared depot routes on 2 April 1995, route 15 was discontinued, and routes 16 and 22 were amended to run full-time. On 16 October 2004, route 16 was amalgamated with route 69 to run between Melbourne University and Kew (Cotham Road) via St Kilda Beach.

The origins of route 16 lie in separate tram lines. The section of track between Queensberry Street (Stop 4) and St Kilda Junction (Stop 30) is the oldest section of this route, dating back to the Brighton Road cable tram which opened on 11 October 1888 by the Melbourne Tramway & Omnibus Company. This cable tram line was electrified in stages by the Melbourne & Metropolitan Tramways Board. The section between Domain Interchange (Stop 20) and St Kilda Junction (Stop 30) was electrified on 27 December 1925. The section between Queensberry Street and City Road (near Stop 14) was electrified on the same day. The line between City Road and Domain Interchange was electrified on 24 January 1926. Meanwhile, the section between Luna Park (stop 138) and St Kilda Junction was originally the Windsor to St Kilda Beach cable tramway which opened on 27 October 1891. This line was electrified on 27 December 1925.

The line between Luna Park and the terminus at Cotham Road (Stop 80) was all constructed by the Prahran & Malvern Tramways Trust. The track between Wattletree Road (Stop 54) and High Street (Stop 57) was part of the original system which opened on 30 May 1910. The section of track between Hawthorn Road (Stop 48) and Wattletree Road opened on 16 December 1911 as part of the line to Windsor station. The section between Hawthorn Road and Luna Park opened on 12 April 1913, and the line from High Street to the Cotham Road terminus opened on 30 May 1913. Meanwhile, the Melbourne, Brunswick & Coburg Tramway Trust (MBCTT) constructed the section of Route 16 north of Queensberry Street towards Melbourne University. This section opened on 31 October 1916.

In 2007 a Siemens Avenio was trialled for three months on route 16.

Operation
Route 16 is operated out of Malvern depot with Z and D1 class trams.

Route map

References

External links

016
016
Transport in the City of Glen Eira
Transport in the City of Port Phillip
Transport in the City of Stonnington
Transport in the City of Boroondara
1936 establishments in Australia